Jouar El-Matn is a village in Lebanon.

In the town is the 18th-century church of Saint Nicolas, noted for its iconostasis of wood. In addition to its collection of icons, the monastery is the site of the Middle East's first Arabic printing press, which first appeared in 1734. A five-room museum displays the old presses and some 450 related objects and pieces of equipment. The oldest model displayed was built between 1726 and 1733 by Abdallah el-Zakhir from Aleppo.

Populated places in the Matn District
Melkite Christian communities in Lebanon